Jingchuvirales is an order of viruses.

Taxonomy
The order contains the following families:

 Aliusviridae
Obscuvirus
Ollusvirus
 Chuviridae
 Crepuscuviridae
Aqualaruvirus
 Myriaviridae
Myriavirus
 Natareviridae
Charybdivirus

References

Virus orders
Negarnaviricota